The 2022 PGA Tour Latinoamérica was the tenth season of the PGA Tour Latinoamérica, the principal men's professional golf tour in Latin America, operated and run by the PGA Tour.

Following a disrupted 2020–21 season due to the COVID-19 pandemic, the tour announced 12 events for the 2022 season.

It was the first season in which the Order of Merit was rebranded as the Totalplay Cup.

Schedule
The following table lists official events during the 2022 season.

Order of Merit
The Order of Merit was titled as the Totalplay Cup and was based on prize money won during the season, calculated using a points-based system. The top five players on the tour earned status to play on the 2023 Korn Ferry Tour.

Developmental Series
The following table lists Developmental Series events during the 2021–22 season.

Notes

References

PGA Tour Latinoamérica
PGA Tour Latinoamerica